Guandi may refer to:

Guan Yu (died 220), general under Liu Bei in the late Han dynasty, later deified as a god known as Guandi
Guandi, Inner Mongolia (官地), a town in Linxi County, Inner Mongolia, China
Guandi, Jilin (官地), a town in Dunhua, Jilin, China
Guandi Township (关堤乡), a township in Xinxiang, Henan, China
Guandi Dam, a gravity dam on the Yalong River in Sichuan, China